Kootenia is a genus of trilobites of the family Dorypygidae. 118 specimens of Kootenia are known from the Greater Phyllopod bed, where they comprise 0.22% of the community. Its major characteristics are that of the closely related Olenoides, including medium size, a large glabella, and a medium-sized pygidium, but also a lack of the strong interpleural furrows on the pygidium that Olenoides has.

Synonyms
Kootenia is sometimes believed to be a junior synonym of Olenoides due to the marked similarities, and the fact that the main difference between them seems to be variable.

References

External links 
 

Burgess Shale fossils
Corynexochida genera
Dorypygidae
Cambrian trilobites
Burgess Shale animals
Cambrian genus extinctions
Wheeler Shale
Paleozoic life of Newfoundland and Labrador